Misc or MISC may refer to:

 Misc (title), a gender neutral title 
 MISC Berhad, or Malaysia International Shipping Corporation
 Minimal instruction set computer, a processor architecture
 Moi International Sports Centre, in  Kasarani, Kenya
 Multisystem inflammatory syndrome in children, a post-infectious disease associated with COVID-19

See also

Miscellaneous